Propyphenazone (known as isopropylantipyrine in Japan) is a derivative of phenazone with similar analgesic and antipyretic effects. Originally patented in 1931, propyphenazone is marketed as a combination formulation with paracetamol and caffeine for treatment of primary headache disorder.

Serious adverse events
Case reports have described acute inferior-wall myocardial infarctions characterized by low atrial rhythms (Kounis syndrome) secondary to propyphenazone use.

Excerpt from WHO comments

Banned
Sri Lanka
Malaysia
Thailand
Turkey

See also 
 Propyphenazone/paracetamol/caffeine

References 

Analgesics
Antipyretics
Pyrazolones
Isopropyl compounds